A One Day International (ODI) is a 50 over cricket match between two representative teams, each having ODI status, as determined by the International Cricket Council (ICC). An ODI differs from Test matches in that the number of overs per team is limited, and that each team has only one innings. , 50 players have represented the Kenyan national team in ODIs, since its debut in 1996.

Kenya gained ODI status in its own right following a strong performance in the 1996 World Cup, a competition they qualified for by gaining a second-placed finish in the 1994 ICC Trophy. The team's first ODI came against India in the 1996 World Cup, a competition for which Kenya was given temporary ODI status, with the team then playing four further matches in the competition. Kenya's first ODI win came in their fourth World Cup match against the West Indies. The Kenyans won the game by 73 runs but ultimately finished last in group A. Kenya have since qualified for four more Cricket World Cups. They reached the group stage in the 1999 competition, the 2007 competition and the 2011 competition. At the 2003 Cricket World Cup, partly hosted in Kenya, the Kenyan team finished second in their group and in doing so qualified for the Super Sixes stage. Kenya finished third in the Super Sixes stage and qualified for the semi-finals where they lost to India by 91 runs. The Kenyan team have played 154 ODI games with the most recent coming in 2014. Thomas Odoyo and Steve Tikolo have played the most ODIs for Kenya with 131 each. Tikolo has scored the most runs with 3369 for the team while Odoyo has taken the most wickets with 141.

Key

List of players

Last updated 30 January 2014, the date of Kenya's last ODI. This list includes all players who have played at least one ODI match and is initially arranged in the order of debut appearance. Where more than one player won their first cap in the same match, those players are initially listed alphabetically.

See also

List of Kenya Twenty20 International cricketers

Notes

References

ODI
Kenya